The 2016 Ironman 70.3 World Championship was a triathlon competition held in Mooloolaba, Queensland, of Australia's Sunshine Coast on September 4, 2016. It was won by Tim Reed of Australia and Holly Lawrence of Great Britain. The championship was organized by the World Triathlon Corporation (WTC) and was the culmination of the Ironman 70.3 series of events that occurred from July 19, 2015 through July 3, 2016. Athletes, both professional and amateur, earned a spot in the championship race by qualifying in races throughout the 70.3 series. A prize purse of $250,000 was distributed to the top 10 male and female professional athletes. The championship location marked the first time the event was be held in the southern hemisphere.

Championship results

Men

Women

Qualification
The 2016 Ironman 70.3 Series featured 87 events that enabled qualification to the 2015 World Championship event. Professional triathletes qualified for the championship race by competing in races during the qualifying period, earning points towards their pro rankings. For the 2016 championship race that period was August 2, 2015 to July 3, 2016. An athlete's five highest scoring races were counted toward their pro rankings. The top 50 males and top 35 females in the pro rankings qualified for the championship race. The previous five 70.3 champions received an automatic qualifying spot provided they validate their entry by competitively finishing one qualifying race. Winners of the five regional 70.3 championships also automatically qualified for the championship race. These winners did not count towards the final 50 and 35 qualifiers Professional athletes were also eligible for prize purses at each qualifying event, which ranged in total size from $75,000 to $100,000.

Amateur triathletes could qualify for the championship race by earning a qualifying slot at one of the qualifying events. At qualifying events, slots were allocated to each age group category, male and female, with the number of slots given out based on that category's proportional representation of the overall field. Each age group category was tentatively allocated one qualifying spot in each qualifying event. Some 70.3 events also served as qualifiers for the military and handcycle divisions into the full Ironman World Championships in Hawaii.

Qualifying Ironman 70.3 events

*
‡
m
X

References

External links
Ironman 70.3 Series website

Ironman World Championship
Ironman
Ironman 70.3
Sport in the Sunshine Coast, Queensland
Triathlon competitions in Australia